6-Hydroxycyanidin is an anthocyanidin.

Glycosides
6-Hydroxycyanidin 3-malonylglucoside can be extracted from the flowers of Alstroemeria sp.

References

Anthocyanidins
Pyrogallols
Catechols